John Flynn (born 5 June 1984) is an Irish sportsperson who currently plays Gaelic football for Wicklow Senior Football Championship team Baltinglass and was a member of the Wicklow senior team from 2003 to 2012. While Flynn remained as a sub for most he was called up in 2010 after the current goalkeeper Mervyn Travers sustained a serious knee injury which forced him out, Flynn subsequently replaced Travers and remained in goalkeeping position. In October 2012, Flynn announced his retirement from inter-county football.
Flynn returned to the panel in early 2013 after being recalled.

References

1984 births
Living people
Baltinglass footballers
Gaelic football goalkeepers
Wicklow inter-county Gaelic footballers